Fourmile Creek is a stream in the U.S. state of South Dakota. It is a tributary of the Belle Fourche River.

Fourmile Creek received its name from its distance  from a pioneer trail.

See also
List of rivers of South Dakota

References

Rivers of Butte County, South Dakota
Rivers of Meade County, South Dakota
Rivers of South Dakota